Matthew Judge (born 18 January 1985), is a footballer who plays for Thurrock in the Conference South as a striker.

Judge was with Tottenham Hotpsur for five seasons before joining Luton Town. He scored his only senior goal for Luton in a Football League Trophy game against Stevenage Borough.

In 2004, Judge was told that he would not be offered a professional deal and duly departed from Kenilworth Road in a season that had seen him earn his first cap for the Republic of Ireland U-19 side.

After an unsuccessful trial with Southend United, Judge signed for Dagenham & Redbridge. Unable to break into the first-team on a regular basis at Dagenham, he was released and after spells with Heybridge Swifts and Harlow Town, he signed for Sligo Rovers during the summer of 2006.

He is an Irish former U-19 International and has also been called into the Irish U-21 squad. During December 2008, he was released from Sligo Rovers before signing for Ebbsfleet United in January 2009. He was released by Ebbsfleet and joined Thurrock in October 2009.

Matthew Judge signed for Dunstable Town at the start of the 2011/12 season.                                  As of 2019, he has a job in Loxford (Primary) School of Science and Technology.

References

External links

1985 births
Living people
Republic of Ireland association footballers
Luton Town F.C. players
Dagenham & Redbridge F.C. players
Sligo Rovers F.C. players
Ebbsfleet United F.C. players
Thurrock F.C. players
Dunstable Town F.C. players
League of Ireland players
English Football League players
National League (English football) players
Association football forwards